Statistics of Emperor's Cup in the 1927 season.

Overview
It was contested by 8 teams, and Kobe Icchu Club won the championship.

Results

Quarterfinals
Kansai University 1–1 (lottery) Hokkaido University
Rijo Club 2–1 Hosei University
Kobe Icchu Club 2–0 Yoshino Club
Waseda Gakuin 1–0 Sendai Club

Semifinals
Kansai University 0–4 Rijo Club
Kobe Icchu Club 1–0 Waseda Gakuin

Final

Rijo Club 0–2 Kobe Icchu Club
Kobe Icchu Club won the championship.

References
 NHK

Emperor's Cup
1927 in Japanese football